The Legendary A&M Sessions is an extended play featuring five songs by Captain Beefheart & His Magic Band, recorded early in their career for their original record label A&M Records.  The EP was released by the company in 1984 after Captain Beefheart had gone into retirement.

Production
The EP is compiled from two singles originally released through A&M in 1966. The first of these paired the Bo Diddley cover "Diddy Wah Diddy" with a track written by Don Van Vliet (Beefheart) called "Who Do You Think You're Fooling?"

The second, "Moonchild", was written by producer David Gates (later of the band Bread), and was backed with Van Vliet's "Frying Pan".

The fifth song, "Here I Am I Always Am", was a rejected B-side which was initially planned as the B Side of "Moonchild" (and appears as such on a test pressing) but was passed over in favor of "Frying Pan". It was first officially released on this EP.

Track listing

Personnel
 Don van Vliet (Captain Beefheart) – vocals, harmonica
 Doug Moon – guitar
 Richard Hepner – guitar
 Jerry Handley – bass
 Alex St. Clair Snouffer – drums (track 1–4)
 PG Blakely – drums (track 5)

Notes

References
 Barnes, Mike (2000). Captain Beefheart. Omnibus Press. 

Captain Beefheart albums
1984 debut EPs
A&M Records EPs